Belisario Boeto is a province in the Bolivian department of Chuquisaca.

Subdivision 
The province consists of only one municipality, Villa Serrano Municipality, which is identical to the province. Belisario Boeto Province is further subdivided into three cantons. The cantons with their seats are:

The people 
The people are predominantly not indigenous, 36.0% are of Quechuan descent.

Ref.: obd.descentralizacion.gov.bo

Languages 
The languages spoken in the province are mainly Spanish and Quechua.

Ref.: obd.descentralizacion.gov.bo

External links 
 Population data and map of Belisario Boeto Province (Villa Serrano Municipality)

Provinces of Chuquisaca Department